Cawaii! is a fashion magazine published in Taiwan, People's Republic of China, Thailand, and previously in Japan.

History and profile
Launched as a monthly gal fashion magazine targeted at women in their teens in Japan in March 1996, Cawaii! grew to be one of Japan's major gal magazines, and spawned its two sister magazines, S Cawaii! and Hanachu. Circulation peaked at 400,000 in 2000.

The Chinese edition and the Taiwanese edition were founded before the early 2000s, and the Thai edition was founded in May 2004. The original Japanese edition suspended publication in May 2009 due to declining circulation.

References

1996 establishments in Japan
2004 establishments in Thailand
2009 disestablishments in Japan
Defunct women's magazines published in Japan
Fashion magazines published in China
Fashion magazines published in Japan
Gyaru
Magazines established in 1996
Magazines established in 2004
Magazines disestablished in 2009
Magazines published in Taiwan
Magazines published in Thailand
Monthly magazines published in Japan